Bajó un ángel del cielo (An Angel Came Down from Heaven) is a 1942 Argentine film directed by Luis Cesar Amadori and starring Zully Moreno and Francisco Álvarez. It is based on the play Bichon by Jean de Létraz and Víctor Bouchet.

Cast
 Zully Moreno
 Francisco Álvarez
 Felisa Mary
 Pedro Quartucci
 Maurice Jouvet
 Gladys Rizza
 Julio Renato
 Lola Márquez
 José Olivero
 Manuel Alcón
 Adolfo Linvel
 Warly Ceriani
 León Cerri
 Osvaldo Mariani
 Haydeé Alva
 Vicente Rossi
 Fernando Campos

References

External links

1940s Spanish-language films
1942 films
Films directed by Luis César Amadori
Remakes of French films
Argentine films based on plays
Argentine comedy films
1942 comedy films
Argentine black-and-white films
1940s Argentine films